François Sowa (born 7 March 1937) is a Luxembourgian boxer. He competed in the men's light welterweight event at the 1960 Summer Olympics. At the 1960 Summer Olympics in Rome, he lost to Raoul Sarrazin of Canada by a first-round knockout in the Round of 32.

References

External links
 

1937 births
Living people
Luxembourgian male boxers
Olympic boxers of Luxembourg
Boxers at the 1960 Summer Olympics
People from Schifflange
Light-welterweight boxers